Spider Lake is a lake in Chisago County, Minnesota, in the United States.

The outline of Spider Lake branches like a spider, hence the name.

See also
List of lakes in Minnesota

References

Lakes of Minnesota
Lakes of Chisago County, Minnesota